Erigeron multiceps is a species of flowering plant in the family Asteraceae known by the common names Kern River daisy and Kern River fleabane. It is endemic to California, where it is known mostly from the Kern Plateau in the southern High Sierra Nevada of eastern Tulare County. It is a perennial herb growing a hairy stem up to about 20 centimeters tall from a taproot and caudex. The base of the stem is surrounded by oblong leaves 2 to 5 centimeters long, and there are some smaller leaves along the length of the stem. The inflorescence produces hairy, glandular flower heads filled with yellow disc florets and a fringe of up to 125 thin, flat white to purple-tinged ray florets. The fruit is an achene with a pappus of bristles.

References

External links
Calflora Database: Erigeron multiceps (Kern River daisy,  Kern River fleabane)
Jepson Manual Treatment of Erigeron multiceps
USDA Plants Profile for Erigeron multiceps
UC Photos gallery — Erigeron multiceps

multiceps
Endemic flora of California
Flora of the Sierra Nevada (United States)
Kern River
Natural history of Kern County, California
Natural history of Tulare County, California